Unionville is an unincorporated community in Washington County, in the U.S. state of Ohio.

History
Unionville was established in the 1830s under the name Pinchtown.

References

Unincorporated communities in Washington County, Ohio
Unincorporated communities in Ohio